The 1960 Southern Jaguars football team was an American football team that represented Southern University in the 1960 NCAA College Division football season. The team played its home games at University Stadium in Baton Rouge, Louisiana.

The team was selected by the "Pigskin Huddle" ratings of the Associated Negro Press (ANP) as the 1960 black college national champion. Southern finished ahead of second-place Florida A&M, third-place Grambling, and fourth place Prairie View. Southern also received the W.A. Scott II Memorial Trophy as the national champion.

Quarterback Cyrus Lancaster was selected by the Pittsburgh Courier as the first-team quarterback on its 1960 All-America team. Lineman David Evans and halfback Robert Williams were selected to the second team.

Schedule

References

Southern
Southern Jaguars football seasons
Southwestern Athletic Conference football champion seasons
Black college football national champions
Southern Jaguars football